Harry Hammond (1932–2002) was a British street evangelist.

Harry Hammond may also refer to:
Harry Hammond (footballer) (1868–1921), English footballer
Harry S. Hammond (1884–1960), American football player and businessman
Happy Hammond (Harry Hammond, 1917–1998), Australian comedian and children's show host

See also
Harry Hammond Hess (1906–1969), geologist and United States Navy officer in World War II
Henry Hammond (disambiguation)